Jack Ridley (1905 – death unknown) was an American Negro league outfielder in the 1920s and 1930s. 

A native of Tennessee, Ridley made his Negro leagues debut in 1928 for the Nashville Elite Giants. He played for Nashville two more seasons before moving on to the Cleveland Cubs in 1931, then returning to Nashville to finish his career in 1932 and 1933.

References

External links
, Baseball-Reference Black Baseball stats and Seamheads

1905 births
Date of birth missing
Place of birth missing
Year of death missing
Place of death missing
Cleveland Cubs players
Nashville Elite Giants players
Baseball outfielders
Baseball players from Tennessee